Whirling Papaver ( 米囊旋转舞 ) is a work for solo piano,
composed by He Xuntian in 2014.

Summary
He Xuntian adopted RD Composition, SS Composition and Five Nons in his work Whirling Papaver.

Inspiration
Whirling Papaver was inspired from Xuntian He’s poem Flown Away (1999).

References

External links
Whirling Papaver published by Schott Musik International, Germany

Compositions for piano by He Xuntian
Compositions for solo piano
2014 compositions